Farooq Abdullah (born 21 October 1937) is an Indian politician who was Ex. President of Jammu & Kashmir National Conference. He has served as the Chief Minister of Jammu and Kashmir  on several occasions since 1982, and as the union minister for New and Renewable Energy between 2009 and 2014. He is the son of the 1st elected Chief Minister of Jammu and Kashmir Sheikh Abdullah, and father of former Chief Minister of Jammu and Kashmir Omar Abdullah.

Early life and education

Farooq Abdullah was born to the veteran statesman and National Conference leader Sheikh Abdullah and Begum Akbar Jehan Abdullah. He studied at Tyndale Biscoe School, and subsequently received his MBBS degree from SMS Medical College, Jaipur. He subsequently travelled to the UK to practice medicine.

Family

He is married to Molly, a nurse of British origin. They have a son, Omar, and three daughters, Safia, Hinna, and Sara. Their son Omar Abdullah is also involved in state and national politics, who was  a member of the Lok Sabha and was the chief minister of Jammu and Kashmir. Sara is married to Congress politician Sachin Pilot
.

Political career

Entry into politics
Abdullah was elected to the Lok Sabha unopposed  from Srinagar Lok Sabha constituency in the 1980 General Election.

Chief Minister, 1982–1984
Abdullah was a novice in the political arena of Jammu and Kashmir when he was appointed president of the National Conference in August 1981. His main qualification was that he was the son of Sheikh Abdullah. After his father's death in 1982, Farooq Abdullah became the chief minister of the state. In 1984, a faction of the National conference led by his brother-in-law Ghulam Mohammad Shah broke away, leading to the collapse of his government and his dismissal. Shah subsequently became the Chief Minister with the support of the Congress.

1984–1996
In 1986, G.M. Shah's government was dismissed after the communal 1986 Kashmir riots in South Kashmir, and a new National Conference–Congress government was sworn in with Abdullah as the chief minister, after the Rajiv-Farooq accord. 

A new election was held in 1987 and the National Conference–Congress alliance won the election amid allegations of fraud. This period saw a rise in militancy in the state, with the return of trained militants in J&K and incidents that included the kidnapping of the daughter of the Home Minister Mufti Mohammad Sayeed. The period also witnessed the exodus of Kashmiri Pandits from the Kashmir valley. Subsequently, Farooq Abdullah resigned in protest after Jagmohan was appointed the governor, and the state was brought under Governor's Rule.
He subsequently moved to the United Kingdom.

Chief Minister, 1996–2002
After returning to India, and winning the Legislative Assembly elections in 1996, Abdullah was once again sworn in as chief minister of the state, his fifth time. His government lasted for a full six-year term. In 1999, the National Conference joined the Atal Bihari Vajpayee led National Democratic Alliance, and his son Omar Abdullah was subsequently appointed a union minister of state.

Subsequent political career
In the 2002 Legislative Assembly elections, Omar Abdullah was chosen to lead the National Conference, while Farooq Abdullah intended to continue his political career at the Central level. The National Conference lost the election and a coalition government headed by Mufti Mohammad Sayeed took office.On that year Former Prime Minister Atal Bihari Vajpayee in 2002 promised to make  Abdullah the vice president, but later reneged on his promise.

Farooq Abdullah was subsequently elected to the Rajya Sabha in 2002 from Jammu and Kashmir and  re-elected in 2009. He resigned from the Rajya Sabha in May 2009 and won a seat in the Lok Sabha from Srinagar. Abdullah joined the United Progressive Alliance government as a Cabinet Minister of New and Renewable Energy.

Abdullah contested the Srinagar Lok Sabha seat again in the 2014 General Election, but was defeated by the People's Democratic Party candidate Tariq Hameed Karra. In 2017, Tariq Hameed Karra resigned from the position, leading to a by-election for the Srinagar parliamentary seat. Abdullah got 48,555 votes and defeated PDP candidate Nazir Ahmed Khan by 10,700 votes.

On 16 September 2019, Abdullah became the first mainstream politician to be detained under the Public Safety Act. Prior to this, Abdullah was under house arrest since the scrapping of Article 370 of the Constitution of India. He was released from house detention under the PSA after seven and a half months on 13 March 2020.

In 2022, before the election of the President of India, Mamata Bannerjee along with several other opposition leaders had proposed Abdullah's name as the Opposition's candidate. But Abdullah declined the offer stating that he wanted to remain in active politics for more years and was concentrated in the Kashmir Union Territory issue.

References

External links

|-

|-

|-

|-

|-

1937 births
Living people
20th-century Indian Muslims
21st-century Indian Muslims
Jammu & Kashmir National Conference politicians
Farooq
Rajya Sabha members from Jammu and Kashmir
Chief Ministers of Jammu and Kashmir
Kashmiri people
Chief ministers from Jammu & Kashmir National Conference
Leaders of the Opposition in Jammu and Kashmir
20th-century Indian medical doctors
India MPs 1980–1984
India MPs 2009–2014
Lok Sabha members from Jammu and Kashmir
India MPs 2014–2019
Medical doctors from Jammu and Kashmir
India MPs 2019–present
Members of the Cabinet of India
Jammu and Kashmir MLAs 1977–1983
Jammu and Kashmir MLAs 1987–1996
Jammu and Kashmir MLAs 1996–2002